The R763 road is a regional road in County Wicklow in Ireland.

The government legislation that defines the R763, the Roads Act 1993 (Classification of Regional Roads) Order 2012 (Statutory Instrument 54 of 2012), provides the following official description:

Ashford — Annamoe, County Wicklow

Between its junction with R764 at Ballinahinch and its junction with R755 at Annamoe via Nuns Cross, Tiglin and Tomriland all in the county of Wicklow.

See also
National primary road
National secondary road
Regional road
Roads in Ireland

References

Regional roads in the Republic of Ireland
Roads in County Wicklow